Blair Cowan may refer to:

 Blair Cowan (musician), Scottish musician
 Blair Cowan (rugby union) (born 1986), Scottish rugby union player, born in New Zealand